Tres Milagros is a Mexican drama television series that premiered on Azteca Uno on 12 March 2018 and ended on 25 May 2018. Produced by Sony Pictures Television and Televisión Azteca based on the 1970 book Cuando quiero llorar no lloro ("When I want to cry, I don't") by Miguel Otero Silva, of which in 2011 a Colombian version was made with the name Tres Milagros.

Plot 
The series follows the lives of three young people who end up joining their destinies thanks to a prophecy, the prophecy says: "The day that Milagros meets Milagros and Milagros, Milagros and the love of Milagros, They will die". On September 18, 1985 there is a birth of three girls who are baptized with the same name. Catemaco's jaguar manages to see the connection between the three girls. and to his own sorrow he anticipates a prophecy. What will make the three girls start their lives and both fall in love with the same man, but only one of them will die.

Cast 
 Fátima Molina as Milagros Cruz "Nikita"
 Alexa Martín as Milagros Rendón
 Marcela Guirado as Milagros Valdapeña "Milú"
 Joaquín Ferreira as Fernando
 Brandon Peniche as Aquiles
 Cuauhtli Jiménez as Chemo
 Lucas Bernabé as Marcelo
 Gerardo Taracena as Julián Cruz
 Marissa Saavedra as Daniela Rendón
 Carlos Corona as Tomás Rendón
 Montserrat de León as Prudencia
 Luis Caballero as Ricardo Valdapeña
 Paula Serrano as Roberta Treviño de Valdapeña
 Giovanna Zacarías as Celina
 Shalim Ortiz as Brayan
 Mercedes Olea as Carmelita
 Regina Reynoso as Nayeli
 Sandra Kai as Ivonne Treviño
 Marco León as Salvador Rendón
 Héctor Holten as Álvaro Treviño
 Axel Alcántara as El Tripas
 Cristina Campuzano as Reina Delgadillo
 Yany Prado as Luz María "La Negra"
 Leticia Pedrajo as Señorita Treviño
 Marcela Alcaráz as Camila Ibargüengoitia
 Sharis Cid as Graciela

Special guest stars 
 Arturo Peniche as Ulises Suárez

Ratings 
 
}}

Episodes

References

External links 
 

2018 telenovelas
Mexican telenovelas
TV Azteca telenovelas
2018 Mexican television series debuts
2018 Mexican television series endings
Mexican television series based on Colombian television series
Sony Pictures Television telenovelas
Television shows remade overseas